During the course of the Arab–Byzantine wars, exchanges of prisoners of war became a regular feature of the relations between the Byzantine Empire and the Abbasid Caliphate. The exchanges began in the late 8th century and continued until the late 10th century. Most of them took place at the Lamos River in Cilicia, on the border between the two powers.

Background 
Centuries of war between the Byzantine Empire and the Arab Caliphate had led to a degree of mutual understanding and respect, evidenced by a regular pattern of diplomatic and cultural exchange between the two powers. This is exemplified in the protocols for the imperial receptions at the Byzantine court, where the "Eastern Muslims" are accorded the first place immediately after any ecclesiastical officials, including Bulgarians and Frankish co-religionists. There was also humane treatment of prisoners of war by both sides; on the Byzantine side, although Arab prisoners were usually paraded in triumphal processions, they were otherwise generally well treated. Senior figures that were state prisoners were often honoured guests during the duration of their captivity, being regularly invited to attend races at the Hippodrome or imperial banquets at the Great Palace; they were often given gifts as part of imperial ceremonies. Nevertheless, the rank and file were usually sold off as slaves or kept in prison until ransomed or exchanged. Most were employed as a labour force, although some who might be induced to convert to Christianity were given lands to settle. Otherwise they enjoyed the freedom to worship at mosques of their own. Al-Muqaddasi noted that although the Arab captives were made to work as slaves, they could earn money, and that the Byzantines "do not force any of them to eat pork, and they do not slit their noses or their tongues".

Both sides also engaged in regular exchanges of prisoners (ἀλλάγια, allagia, in Greek; fidāʾ, pl. afdiya, in Arabic), which took place on the river Lamos (mod. Limonlu Çayı) in Cilicia, on the border between Byzantium and the Caliphate. A truce was arranged beforehand, and both sides met on the river. The exchange was made man for man, as illustrated by al-Tabari in his report of the 845 exchange: "Two bridges were built over the river, one for the prisoners of each side. Each side released one prisoner, who walked across the bridge towards his co-religionists, simultaneously with his counterpart. After the exchange was complete, the surplus prisoners were either ransomed for money or exchanged for slaves."

Prisoner exchanges 

What is notable in the numbers reported for the exchanges, according to Arnold J. Toynbee, is that even in 845, before the Byzantines gained the upper hand in the Battle of Lalakaon (863), they held more prisoners than the Arabs, despite the wholesale capture and deportation of Byzantine subjects in events like the sack of Amorium in 838. According to Toynbee, this attests to the efficiency of the Byzantine military's  strategy of "dogging and pouncing" the Muslim armies that raided Asia Minor.

See also 
 Prisoners of war in Islam

References

Sources 
 
 
 
 
 
 
 

Prisoner exchanges
Prisoner exchanges
Abbasid Caliphate–Byzantine Empire relations